The Communist Party of Canada ran several candidates in the 2006 federal election, none of whom were elected.

Manitoba

Lisa Gallagher (Brandon—Souris)

Gallagher received 120 votes (0.32%), finishing seventh against Conservative incumbent Merv Tweed.

Ontario

Upali Jinadasa Wannaku Rallage (Brampton—Springdale)

Wannaku Rallage was born and raised in Sri Lanka, and later moved to Italy before coming to the Greater Toronto Area.  He is a trade unionist in the service transportation industry, and a member of the Canada-Sri Lanka Patriotic National Organization.  He received 110 votes (0.23%), finishing fifth against Liberal incumbent Ruby Dhalla.

Sam Hammond (Sudbury)

Hammond received 70 votes (0.15%), finishing seventh against Liberal incumbent Diane Marleau.

Quebec

Evelyn Elizabeth Ruiz (Laurier—Sainte-Marie)
Evelyn Ruiz is active in Montreal's Latin American community. Ruiz received 100 votes (0.2%) finishing ninth against incumbent and Bloc Québécois leader Gilles Duceppe.

Bill Sloan (Westmount—Ville-Marie)
Bill Sloan is a lawyer who specializes in the rights of political refugees. Sloan received 69 votes (0.2%) to finish seventh against the Liberal Party of Canada incumbent, Lucienne Robillard.

Footnotes